Count  was a Japanese politician and cabinet minister of the Meiji period.

Biography 

Hijikata was a samurai in Tosa Domain (modern-day Kōchi Prefecture). He was sent by the domain to Edo for studies, where he became involved in the sonnō jōi movement, and after returning to Tosa, he joined Takechi Hanpeita's  movement. He travelled with Takechi to Kyoto in 1863, where he joined forces with the anti-Tokugawa shogunate forces of Chōshū Domain and made contact with the kuge aristocracy, most notably Sanjō Sanetomi. After the abortive coup against the Shogunate later that year, he was forced into exile with Sanjō to Chōshū. Following the First Chōshū expedition, he fled to Fukuoka Domain together with Sanjō, where he later met with fellow Tosa countrymen Nakaoka Shintarō, and Sakamoto Ryōma whom he assisted in securing Sanjō’s support for the Satchō Alliance.

Following the Meiji restoration, Hijikata joined the Meiji government and was appointed a public prosecutor in Tokyo. He subsequently served in the Imperial Household Ministry and Home Ministry and as Cabinet Secretary to the Daijō-kan cabinet. He was subsequently made a tutor, then an Imperial Councilor to Emperor Meiji, who placed a great deal of confidence in him, and who made him a viscount (shishaku) in the kazoku peerage in 1884.

In 1885, with the establishment of the cabinet system, Hijikata was appointed Minister of Agriculture and Commerce under the 1st Itō Hirobumi administration in 1887, and Imperial Household Ministry from 1887-1898. He was also made a member of the Privy Council from 1888.

Hijikata was awarded the title of count (hakushaku) in 1895. After his retirement from the Imperial Household Ministry, he served as president of Kokugakuin University. He died in 1918 at the age of 86, and his grave is at the Somei Cemetery in Tokyo.

References
 ,  OCLC 579232
   OCLC 12311985
 OCLC 413111
  ;  OCLC 46731178

 
 

1833 births
1918 deaths
Samurai
People from Tosa Domain
People from Kōchi Prefecture
Government ministers of Japan
Meiji Restoration
Kazoku